Yumnam Kamala Devi (born 4 March 1992) is an Indian professional footballer who plays as a midfielder and an occasional striker for the Indian team. She currently plays for East Coast Railway in the Odisha Women's League.

Career

International career
Kamala Devi was a part of the Indian team that won the SAFF Championships, 2010 And' SAG South Asian games in 2010, 2012 and 2014. At the 2012 tournament, she was awarded the Best Player of the Final. She finished the tournament scoring seven goals, also scoring in the final against Nepal, in the 83rd minute. 
At the 2014 Asian Games, she scored five goals in India's first match against Maldives. She scored five goals and was the top-scorer at the 2016 South Asian Games. It included a brace in the final against Nepal that helped her win the gold medal. SAFF Women's Championship 2016. Four Time SAFF -Winners' 2010,2012,2014,2016.Two Time SAG 2010,2016. ONE Time Asian games Participate'2014.

Club career 
In 2016, Devi was signed by Eastern Sporting Union to play in the inaugural season of the Indian Women's League. She helped her team win the League scoring 15 goals in 10 games and was the joint top-scorer alongside Sanju Yadav. 12 of those goals came in the final round. It included a brace in the final against Rising Student.

Devi also plays for Railways in various competitions.

Devi was awarded AIFF 2017 Woman Footballer of the Year on July 23, 2018.

Career statistics

International goals

Honours 

India
 SAFF Championship: 2010, 2012, 2014, 2016
 South Asian Games Gold medal: 2010, 2016

Eastern Sporting Union
 Indian Women's League: 2016–17

Gokulam Kerala
 Indian Women's League: 2019–20

Railways
 Senior Women's National Football Championship: 2015–16

Manipur
 Senior Women's National Football Championship: 2008–09

Individual
 Indian Women's League Top Scorer: 2016–17
 AIFF Women's Footballer of the Year, 2017
 Top Scorer, South Asian Games, 2016- 5 Goals
 Most Valuable Player of the Final, SAFF WOMEN'S CHAMPIONSHIP, 2012.
 Top Scorer, 12 Goals, IWL, 2017
 Best Player, SENIOR WOMEN'S NATIONAL CHAMPIONSHIP, 2016.
 Top Scorer 16 Goals, U-17, NATIONAL CHAMPIONSHIP, 2006.

References

External links 
 Yumnam Kamala Devi at All India Football Federation
 
 Yumnam Kamala Devi at eurosport.com

Women's association football midfielders
India women's international footballers
Living people
Footballers at the 2014 Asian Games
1992 births
Indian women's footballers
Footballers from Manipur
People from Thoubal district
Sportswomen from Manipur
21st-century Indian women
21st-century Indian people
Asian Games competitors for India
South Asian Games gold medalists for India
South Asian Games medalists in football
Eastern Sporting Union players
Gokulam Kerala FC Women players
Indian Women's League players